Kakinada Rural (Assembly constituency) is a constituency in Kakinada district of Andhra Pradesh, representing the state legislative assembly in India. It is one of the seven assembly segments of Kakinada (Lok Sabha constituency), along with Tuni, Prathipadu (SC), Pithapuram, Peddapuram, Kakinada City and Jaggampeta.

Kurasala Kannababu is the present MLA of the constituency, who won the 2019 Andhra Pradesh Legislative Assembly election from YSR Congress Party. As of March 2019, there are a total of 249,011 electors in the constituency.

Mandals 
The three mandals that form the assembly constituency.

Members of Legislative Assembly

Election results

Assembly elections 2009

Assembly elections 2014

Assembly elections 2019

See also 
 List of constituencies of the Andhra Pradesh Legislative Assembly

References 

Assembly constituencies of Andhra Pradesh